Jefferson Anderson (Pasila)  is a Finnish animated sitcom. The computer-animated series portrays a satirical view of daily events in Helsinki at a police precinct in the suburb of Pasila. The series is made by members of the same team that made the award-winning series The Autocrats, a political animated satire. In 2007, the Finnish Broadcasting Company (Yle) sent Pasila to compete for the Rose d'Or. The show's first two seasons were later dubbed in English and are available online. A sequel, Pasila 2.5 – The Spin-Off, was broadcast in 2014-2016.

Characters

Lieutenant Kyösti Pöysti (Jefferson Anderson )
Pöysti (voiced by Jani Volanen (Original series), Tero Koponen (Spin-off)) is the main character, aged 30 or 31 years throughout the series. He is single and is always seen sucking on a pacifier, showing his infantility and emotional handicap. However, his jadedness and penetrating cynicism allows him to see through schemes and discern motives. Pöysti's modus operandi can be described as psychological: he finds the sore spots of criminals by going through several options and uses them to crack the perps – or not. Sometimes he goes for overkill, like provoking people to jump off the roof or arresting innocent people without grounds.

Precinct captain Rauno Repomies
Repomies (voiced by Kari Hietalahti) is the Captain of the Pasila precinct, a man with a moustache and heavy medication. He is nearing retirement and often displays antiquated manners. He keeps on getting more confused and more poetic, until someone usually reminds him to take his pills. He is extremely gullible and many episodes involve him ending up as the victim of the main perpetrator. Repomies and Pöysti have a bad relationship because of their incompatibility: Repomies is annoyed by Pöysti's slacking and disrespect for authority, but his authoritarian management practices aren't very successful at dealing with this either.

Officer Tommi Neponen
Neponen (voiced by Juho Milonoff) is Pöysti's classmate from the Police Academy. He's described as the only sane person in the Pasila precinct. He's been married for seven years and has children. Although Pöysti considers him a friend, there is a running joke that Pöysti doesn't remember Neponen's first name.

Desk sergeant Pekka Routalempi
Routalempi (voiced by Juho Milonoff) is the 46-year-old desk sergeant at the precinct. He keeps on pondering common things in everyday life and considers these phenomena "fascinating". As he explains in an episode, this behaviour was adopted after he stopped drinking and therefore saw how wonderful life could be even without alcohol. His stories are so mind-numbingly boring that Repomies thinks using him as an interrogator is a violation of human rights treaties (which is "fascinating" too). He is divorced. He is terrible at chases, because he doesn't want to hurt people and doesn't want to overtake other cars.

Helga
Helga (voiced by Mari Lehtonen) is the token woman police officer, although very manly in her manners and the most macho of all characters. Her father is ashamed of his daughter, as he wanted a son. He threw Helga into a river as a baby. Helga is doing her best to fulfill her father's wishes and blames her mother for being a girl.

Juhani Kontiovaara
Juhani Kontiovaara  (voiced by Jani Volanen (Original series), Tero Koponen (Spin-off)) is the presenter in the morning TV show Huomenta ihmiset ("Good Morning, People"). His voice and behavior is exaggeratedly calm. The character is a parody of Lauri Karhuvaara, presenter at Huomenta Suomi. In his free time, he goes orienteering during the weekends. He holds the police in high esteem and he thinks he's Pöysti's best friend, even though Pöysti hates him and his show.

Darja
Darja appears in the spin-off series. She is a hippie that does yoga and believes in horoscopes and auras. No criminal investigation method, such as meditation or remote seeing, is too far out for her. She tries to see the best in everyone, being reluctant to assume malice or use force. However, this is only up to a point; she can be firm if pushed enough.

Episodes

Season 1

Season 2

References

External links
  

2007 Finnish television series debuts
2000s Finnish television series
2000s adult animated television series
Finnish adult animated comedy television series
Animated satirical television series
Yle original programming